The German Construction Workers' Union (DBV) was a trade union representing building workers in Germany.

The union was founded on 1 January 1911, when the Central Union of Masons merged with the Central Union of Construction Workers, the two bringing together 235,217 members.  The Central Union of Plasterers joined at the start of 1912.  The union affiliated to the General Commission of German Trade Unions, and in 1919 became a founding affiliate of the General German Trade Union Confederation.  It was also the leading union in the International Federation of Building Workers.

On 1 January 1923, the union merged with the Central Union of Glaziers and the Central Union of Potters, to form the German Union of Building Trades.

Presidents
1911: Theodor Bömelburg
1913: Fritz Paeplow

References

Building and construction trade unions
Trade unions in Germany
Trade unions established in 1911
Trade unions disestablished in 1922